Marshawn Powell (born January 5, 1990) is an American basketball player for Leche Río Breogán of the LEB Oro. He formerly played for s.Oliver Würzburg of the Basketball Bundesliga in Germany.

References

External links
ESPN Profile
Eurobasket.com Profile

1990 births
Living people
American expatriate basketball people in Germany
American expatriate basketball people in Italy
American men's basketball players
Arkansas Razorbacks men's basketball players
Basketball players from Virginia
Hamburg Towers players
Pallalcesto Amatori Udine players
Power forwards (basketball)
s.Oliver Würzburg players
Sportspeople from Newport News, Virginia